Ruckstuhl is a surname. Notable people with the name include:

Alphonse Ruckstuhl (1901–date of death unknown), Swiss fencer
Friedrich Ruckstuhl (1853–1942), French-born American sculptor and art critic
Géraldine Ruckstuhl (born 1998), Swiss heptathlete
Karin Ruckstuhl (born 1980), Dutch heptathlete

See also
Alexander Rückstuhl (born 1971), Swiss rower